Paranormal Challenge is an American competitive paranormal reality television series that aired from June 17, 2011 to September 16, 2011 on the Travel Channel. A spin-off of Ghost Adventures, the series was created and hosted by lead investigator Zak Bagans, with each episode featuring him challenging two teams of ghost hunters to go head-to-head in a weekly competition to gather paranormal evidence by spending a night in reportedly haunted locations in the United States. The final episode aired on September 16, 2011 and judge David Schrader announced that the show would not be renewed for a second season.

Judges

 Dave Schrader - regular
 Gary Galka - (ep. 1)
 Alexandra Holzer - (ep. 2 & 5)
 Jeff Belanger - (ep. 3)
 Beth Brown - (ep. 3 & 6)
 Mark Constantino - (ep. 4)
 Debby Constantino - (ep. 4)
 Pamela Rae Heath - (ep. 6 & 9)
 Bill Chappell - (ep. 7)
 Chris Fleming - (ep. 7 & 12)
 Andrew Nichols - (ep. 8 & 11)
 Ron Fabiani - (ep. 8)
 Michael Shermer - (ep. 10)
 Danielle Harris - (ep. 11)
 Patrick Burns - guest
 Amber Delly - guest

Series overview

See also
Ghost Adventures
 Ghost hunting
 List of prizes for evidence of the paranormal
 One Million Dollar Paranormal Challenge
 Paranormal television

References

External links

2011 American television series debuts
2011 American television series endings
2010s American documentary television series
2010s American reality television series
Paranormal reality television series
American television spin-offs
Travel Channel original programming
Ghost Adventures